Eric Loren is an American film and television actor based in London. He played Mr Diagoras and the Dalek Sec Hybrid in the long-running British TV series Doctor Who.  He also played Kurtis Trent in Tomb Raider: The Angel of Darkness and a War Department Lieutenant in Saving Private Ryan.  In 2008 he guest starred in the Doctor Who audio adventure Assassin in the Limelight. Most recently, Loren has appeared in 2011 Video Game, Battlefield 3, as Sergeant Steve Campo. In 2001 he had a role in season 4 of The Worst Witch as teacher, Andy Starfinder.

Filmography

Film

Television

Video games

References

External links
 

Male actors from Massachusetts
American male film actors
American male television actors
American male video game actors
People from Boston
American male voice actors
American expatriate male actors in the United Kingdom
Living people
20th-century American male actors
21st-century American male actors
Year of birth missing (living people)